In gridiron football, a turnover on downs occurs when a team's offense has used all their downs but has not progressed downfield enough to earn another set of downs. The resulting turnover gives possession of the ball to the team currently on defense.

In American football, both indoor and outdoor, a team has four opportunities (each opportunity is called a "down") to gain at least ten yards or to score.  Any ground gained during each down short of these ten yards is kept for the next chance, and any ground lost must be regained in addition to the ten yards. Thus, if a team gains four yards on first down, it then has three chances to gain the six remaining yards, and if a team loses four yards on first down then it must gain a total of fourteen yards over the next three chances. If a team gains the required ten yards, it receives another four downs to gain another ten yards (an event called a "first down") or cross the goal line for a score. The same principles apply in Canadian football, except that a team has only three chances to gain ten yards instead of four.

In the NFL, turnovers on downs do not count as turnovers in statistics for either team; turnover statistics tally turnovers that occur during a play — namely, fumble recoveries and interceptions.

Strategy
In most cases, teams will use one less chance (i.e. three in American football, two in Canadian football) than they are permitted to try to gain a first down. Usually, if a team has failed to gain the needed yardage when playing its final down, it will then punt the ball, offering the opposing team possession (the kicking team aims to place the ball downfield), or attempt to kick a field goal if close enough (typically within 40 yards of the goal posts). In the event of a successful punt, the opposing team will start its new set of downs at the spot the punt returner can advance the ball to before being tackled (or goes out of bounds), or where the punt goes out of bounds, or (in American football only) where the punt comes to rest when rolling to a stop or at the spot where the punt is fair-caught.

Reasons for not kicking on last down
In some instances, a team may elect to use its last down to try to gain the yardage, rather than punt or kick a field goal . This is often referred to as "going for it" or "sticking" (as opposed to "kicking"). This disadvantage is that if this conversion attempt fails, the opposing team will immediately take possession of the ball at the spot where the play ended, rather than (usually) much farther away from a score in the case of a punt. Factors that may lead to a team making this choice are:
 Only a small distance is needed to gain a first down
 Only a small distance is needed to score a touchdown (a team's incentive to "go for it" in this situation may be higher due to the higher reward--a touchdown--if they succeed)
 A team is close to, but not within field goal range, such that a punt may not net very many yards (in American football, if the punt reaches the end zone, the opposing team will get the ball on the 20-yard line).
 A team believes it has a chance to convert the first down by way of a fake punt or a fake field goal.
 A bad snap or a fumble by the offensive forces a team to abandon a field goal or punt attempt and unexpectedly go for it.
 A blocked field goal or a punt by the defense ends up being recovered by the offense and unexpectedly goes for it.
 A team believes the defense might cause a penalty thus giving the team on offense a closer distance to convert or, depending on the penalty, an automatic first down.
 A team's kicking or punting team may not be very good and goes for it to avoid the possibility of missing a field goal or having a punt blocked.
 At certain times of the year the weather might be factor into going for it instead of kicking or punting the ball.
 The game's end is near and the team wants to score additional points to prevent the opposing team from coming back to tie or win the game.
 The game's end is near or in overtime and if the team surrenders possession of the ball, it may not have another chance to score what is needed to win or tie the game.
 The game's end is near, and the team is in field goal range but is trailing such that a field goal would not tie or win the game, but a touchdown would.
 The game's end is near and the team is out of field goal range but there is enough time on the clock to execute one final play to score a touchdown to tie or win the game via Hail Mary pass or a series of lateral passes.
 The game's first half end is near and they need to score a field goal or a touchdown to cut into the deficit, tie the game, go ahead or extend the lead before halftime.
 A team is trailing by more than a touchdown, and needs a touchdown AND one or more additional scores to tie or win the game.
 In certain situations near the end of the game the team on fourth down is leading, may attempt it to get a first down in order to run out the clock or prevent the opposing team from possessing the ball for a game tying or game winning score.
 In certain leagues, if a game is in overtime, the team may need to convert on fourth down in order to score a touchdown to win the game automatically, whereas a field goal would not.
 In certain leagues, in order to make the playoffs, tiebreaking procedures include points scored so a team might want to score touchdowns rather than field goals to win the tiebreaker.
 Finally, there is no obvious reason to attempt a conversion, a team may nevertheless attempt one if it believes the attempt will surprise the defense or catch it off-balance.

One American high school coach has achieved national notoriety for his absolute refusal to punt, regardless of field position. Kevin Kelley, the former head coach at Pulaski Academy in Little Rock, Arkansas, led the school to multiple state championships with a heavily analytics-driven strategy. After becoming Pulaski's head coach in 2003, he ran across a research paper by a Harvard professor who argued that punting made no mathematical sense. Kelley responded by initially reducing punting to less than twice per game, and soon eliminating it altogether.

See also
 1st & Ten, the graphics system used in NFL broadcast to superimpose the first-down line on the field of play
 Glossary of American football

References

American football terminology
Canadian football terminology